Modern American Usage may refer to:

 Follett's Modern American Usage, a 1966 usage guide for contemporary American English by  Wilson Follett
 Garner's Modern American Usage, a 2009 usage guide for contemporary American English by Bryan Garner

See also
 A Dictionary of Modern English Usage, a 1926 usage guide for contemporary British English by Henry Watson Fowler
 American English, a set of dialects of the English language used mostly in the United States
 Usage, the manner in which written and spoken language is used